True & Livin is a studio album by Zion I. It was released by Live Up Records in 2005.

Critical reception

Kabir Hamid of Chicago Reader described the album as "soulful hip-hop that favors acoustic sounds over electronics, thoughtfulness over braggadocio, and spirit-enhancing grooves over testosterone-fueled beats." Rachel Swan of East Bay Express wrote, "This is hip-hop without irony, geared for people who prefer feel-good vibes and songs with happy endings." A.J. Wolosenko of Vibe wrote, "True & Livin is an album full of contradictions, and that's what makes it so interesting and appealing." Del F. Cowie of Exclaim! commented that "While past efforts dabbled with drum & bass and delved into melodic electronics and live instrumentation, this organic effort represents the most potent synthesis yet of their spiritually-infused hip-hop."

Track listing

References

External links
 

2005 albums
Zion I albums